Bruderer is a surname. Notable people with the surname include:

Carlos Andrés Bruderer (born 1967), Guatemalan alpine skier
Christian Bruderer (born 1968), Guatemalan alpine skier
Nicolle Bruderer (born 1993), Guatemalan cyclist
Pascale Bruderer (born 1977), Swiss politician